Peter Nash Hepworth is a first-class cricketer. Born in Ackworth, Yorkshire in 1967 he played for Leicestershire from 1988 to 1994 as a right-handed batsman and occasional off spin bowler. He scored 2113 first-class runs in 59 first-class games, with a best of 129 among his 3 centuries, and took 30 wickets. He played 38 List A one-day matches, scoring 7 half centuries and taking 25 wickets. He was also the first team coach for the French national team around the 1999 era with ex Lancashire player, Jack Simmons

References

1967 births
English cricketers
Leicestershire cricketers
Living people